The Paso de Jama is a mountain pass through the Andes between Chile and Argentina, at an elevation of  at the border. It is the northernmost road border crossing between the two countries. The pass is reached via Chile Route 27 and via National Route 52 (Argentina).

The pass links the city of Jujuy in Argentina with San Pedro de Atacama in Chile.  The road was opened on 6 December 1991, and has been paved throughout 2005. It is open throughout the year, although occasionally closed by snow. It is used by truck traffic between northern Argentina and Paraguay and the ports of northern Chile.

  
There is an additional Chilean border station at San Pedro de Atacama, 160 km from the pass.

References

External links 

Enjoy Argentina website
Argentine Gendarmeria website (in Spanish)

Mountain passes of Chile
Mountain passes of Argentina
Mountain passes of the Andes
Argentina–Chile border crossings
Landforms of Antofagasta Region